The Royal Australian Army Medical Corps (RAAMC) is the branch of the Australian Army responsible for providing medical care to Army personnel. The AAMC was formed in 1902 through the amalgamation of medical units of the various Australian colonies and was first deployed to South Africa as a small detachment of personnel supporting the Australian Commonwealth Horse during the Second Boer War. The corps has participated in every Australian Army operation since then, including wars and peacekeeping operations. The "Royal" prefix was granted in 1948.

History
The Australian Army Medical Corps was formed on 1 July 1902 by combining the medical services of the armed forces of the various Australian colonies that had been in existence before Federation, which had their origins in the medical structures of the British forces that had deployed to Australia during the late 18th and early 19th centuries. The corps' first deployment was to the Second Boer War, where it provided a field hospital and a stretcher bearer company attached in support of the Australian Commonwealth Horse, the first contingent of Australian troops deployed operationally following Federation. The force's role was limited as by the time it was deployed the large scale fighting was basically over. Prior to this, though, the various colonial forces had also contributed medical detachments to the war in support of their own and other British and colonial forces, and these units – consisting of various types of medical personnel including surgeons, dentists, cooks, drivers, and bearers – had been heavily involved. One officer, Lieutenant Neville Howse, of the New South Wales Army Medical Corps, received the Victoria Cross for his actions during the war;  Howse eventually rose to become Director of Medical Services within the Australian Imperial Force. An earlier deployment had also occurred in 1885, when a New South Wales Contingent of infantry and artillery was deployed to assist British forces in the Sudan conflict, a small medical detachment had also been deployed.

The development of medical units within the Australian colonial forces had begun in the mid-1850s when the colonial military forces had been in their infancy. Initially, it had been limited largely to single doctors who were attached to infantry units in an honorary role, but as the colonial military forces had become more sophisticated, various medical units or corps were formed, consisting of a variety of personnel including doctors, non-commissioned officers, orderlies, bearers, and dispensers as well as cooks and drivers. Within each colony, these units were tasked with various duties including conducting medical examinations of recruits, and providing emergency medical aid during field manoeuvres; initially, they were unpaid volunteers, but eventually a system of paid part-time soldiering developed. The reliance upon part-time professionals is a common theme in the corps' development, due largely the nature of the specialised skill sets required by some personnel, particularly doctors and surgeons; however, as the corps' role has expanded, it has become a broader organisation, with personnel serving in many capacities including professional and non-professional roles including stretcher bearers, orderlies, medical assistants, pathologists, radiographers, pharmacists, drivers, physiotherapists, as well as the traditional domains of the medical officer, and in many of these areas, particularly after the Second World War there has been an expansion of the size of the corps' regular personnel, although Reservists continue to provide much of its higher clinically trained personnel.

Since its involvement in South Africa, the corps' role as a supporting branch of the Australian Army has expanded considerably as the importance of medicine as an enabler to successful military operations has become apparent. As a result, the corps has seen service during all major Australian Army deployments and wars since its establishment, including the First and Second World Wars, the Korean War, Vietnam, and various peacekeeping operations. During these conflicts, corps personnel have either been embedded directly into combat formations to provide medical support at the lowest level possible, or have been formed into dedicated medical units. The various types of units raised for these deployments also reflects the development of the corps. Early units raised were quite rudimentary and provided only narrowly focused capabilities, but over time increasingly sophisticated units have been raised. For instance during the First World War, the corps raised various units including: casualty clearing stations, field ambulances, stationary hospitals, general hospitals, hospital ships, sanitary sections, infections diseases hospitals, convalescent depots, and even sanatoriums. The Second World War saw similar units, but also the raising of various transport services, including trains, bacteriological and pathology laboratories, hospital laundries, administrative units and stores depots. A field ambulance unit – the 8th – was also deployed to Vietnam, as was a field hospital.

The "Royal" prefix was granted on 10 November 1948, and the day is celebrated as a corps' day. The Army School of Health was established the same year at Puckapunyal, Victoria, but it was moved to Portsea in 1950, and then later to the Army Logistic Training Centre at Latchford Barracks at Bonegilla, in 1998.

In the post-Vietnam era, RAAMC personnel have supported operational deployments to the Gulf War, Afghanistan, Iraq and peacekeeping missions in Namibia, Cambodia, Somalia, Rwanda, Bouganville and East Timor. A role 2 health facility was also deployed to Iraq in support of Task Group Taji.

Current role

Together with the Royal Australian Army Dental Corps and the Royal Australian Army Nursing Corps, the RAAMC is responsible for providing the Australian Army's health capability. The corps is tasked with providing the Army with a range of medical services, ranging from pre hospital care including emergency battlefield care, initial wound surgery, post operative care, rehabilitation, and preventive and aviation medical support. Regular and reserve soldiers and officers of the RAAMC perform a variety of functions, with graduates of the 18-month Regular first appointment course at the Royal Military College, Duntroon and its modularised Reserve equivalent, filling command, leadership and management roles as general service officers tasked with facilitating the efficient co-ordination, administration and management of specialist troops including medical officers, psychologists, pathologists, radiographers, paramedics, combat medical attendants, preventive medicine technicians, and medical technicians. Personnel within these trades are posted to a variety of units including four multi-purpose health battalions, under the command of the 2nd Health Brigade. These units are located around the country and provide support to the three regular Army manoeuvre brigades – the 1st, 3rd and 7th Brigades – and the Reserve 2nd Division. Deployed combat formations based around infantry battalions, or armoured, artillery and engineer regiments include RAAMC personnel, who are provided by detaching individuals or small teams as required.

Current units
RAAMC personnel are currently employed in the following units:

2nd Health Brigade
 1st Health Battalion: Darwin, Northern Territory; and Perth, Western Australia
 2nd Health Battalion: Enoggera, Queensland; and Sydney, New South Wales
 3rd Health Battalion: Keswick, South Australia; Edinburgh, South Australia; Melbourne, Victoria; and Hobart, Tasmania
 4th Health Battalion: Townsville, Queensland and Cairns, Queensland.
 Army Logistic Training Centre: (Albury–Wodonga);
 Medical Centres located at Kapooka, New South Wales; Bandiana, Victoria; and Canberra, Australian Capital Territory;
 Army Malaria Institute: (Enoggera, Queensland);
 Australia's Federation Guard: Canberra, Australian Capital Territory.

Colonels-in-Chief
The following people have served as Colonel-in-Chief of the RAAMC:

Order of precedence

See also
Australian Army Medical Units, World War I
Royal Army Medical Corps

References
 Citations

Bibliography

Further reading

External links
 RAAMC Association website

Medical
Military units and formations established in 1902
Military medicine in Australia
Australian army units with royal patronage
1902 establishments in Australia